Jiangya Town is an urban town in Cili County, Zhangjiajie, Hunan Province, People's Republic of China.

Administrative division
The town is divided into 47 villages and 5 communities, the following areas: 

  Donghejie Community
  Linjiang Community
  Xinglongjie Community
  Dingzijie Community
  Nongmaoshichang Community
  Longwanggang Village
  Bijiaping Village
  Sanshuang Village
  Jiaochangping Village
  Meishiping Village
  Longtai Village
  Lianping Village
  Baiyan Village
  Wusi Village
  Sipo Village
  Lijiayu Village
  Wulidui Village
  Guanta Village
  Qingshuidong Village
  Guanqiao Village
  Badouqiu Village
  Zhuojiayu Village
  Changyu Village
  Qipanta Village
  Jiangya Village
  Jiuxi Village
  Bijia Village
  Hexin Village
  Taojiayu Village
  Laotang Village
  Shuangtan Village
  Jinji Village
  Fengya Village
  Baiyanyu Village
  Xiongjiazhuang Village
  Huangjinta Village
  Xinglongpu Village
  Guangji Village
  Ganxiping Village
  Ximuping Village
  Zhaigongpo Village
  Jigongluo Village
  Huitangping Village
  CheYanping Village
  Xiniuyuan Village
  Wanshiping Village
  Jiuliya Village
  Sanchaxi Village
  Piya Village
  Qingchangling Village
  Yanbantian Village
  Guanya Village
  Jiangya Village

References

Divisions of Cili County